"Desert Rain" is the third single by Romanian musician and producer Edward Maya following his international hit "Stereo Love" and "This Is My Life". The music is adapted from a traditional Romanian folk song titled 'Sârbă ciobănească'.

Music video 
The official music video for was uploaded to YouTube on 28 December 2010.

Track listing

Charts

Weekly charts

Year-end charts

References

2010 singles
Edward Maya songs
2010 songs
Sony BMG singles
Songs written by Vika Jigulina
Songs written by Edward Maya